The 22 Wing Band is a military band of the Royal Canadian Air Force. The band is currently based at CFB North Bay in Ontario. It was formed between 1989 and 1990 primarily to support ceremonial functions at the base. Its founder, then-Warrant Officer Chip Kean recruited 25 local civilian musicians to join the newly sanctioned band which designated Kean as its first official bandmaster. Jean retired in 1995, however, returned in 1998 as part of the Air Reserve due to the danger of the band being disbanded by the Department of National Defence.

Today, it takes part and focuses its attention toward other events such as public concerts and charities. The company-sized band consists of 60–65 musicians who, make up the parade and concert band, as well as a Jazz and brass quartet. The current band director is Sergeant Scott Barons. With the exception of the Band Director and Assistant Director, are volunteer musicians, both military and civilian.

Notable events
Salute To Military Families at the Annual Children's Festival in the Capitol Centre in North Bay
Salute to Policing Tattoo
Canada 150 celebrations in North Bay, Ontario
50th Anniversary of the North American Aerospace Defense Command (NORAD)
Change of Command at CFB North Bay
Remembrance Day celebrations

See also
 Canadian military bands
 Royal Canadian Air Force
 Royal Canadian Air Force Band
 Royal Air Force March Past

References 

Bands of the Royal Canadian Air Force
Royal Canadian Air Force